Saúl Sadam Nelle (born 24 November 1993) is an Argentine professional footballer who plays as a midfielder for Chacarita Juniors.

Career
Nelle began in the youth system of local clubs Independiente de 1º de Mayo, Vélez Sarsfield de Catamarca and Villa Dolores before joining Independiente in 2009. He began his senior career with the latter in 2016. His professional debut arrived on 7 February during a 1–0 victory over Belgrano, which preceded the midfielder making his second appearance in the club's penultimate fixture of the 2016 Argentine Primera División against Arsenal de Sarandí on 14 May. Two months later, Nelle completed a loan move to Primera B Nacional's Los Andes. Twenty-eight appearances in all competitions followed.

On 14 August 2017, Nelle joined Almagro on loan. He remained for 2017–18, featuring in twenty-three fixtures as Almagro lost in a championship play-off to Aldosivi. July 2018 saw Nelle loaned to Defensores de Belgrano. His first appearance came on 24 July in the Copa Argentina against Atlético de Rafaela, with their opponents winning 4–1.

Career statistics
.

References

External links

1993 births
Living people
People from Catamarca Province
Argentine footballers
Association football midfielders
Argentine Primera División players
Primera Nacional players
Club Atlético Independiente footballers
Club Atlético Los Andes footballers
Club Almagro players
Defensores de Belgrano footballers
Nueva Chicago footballers
Villa Dálmine footballers
CSyD Tristán Suárez footballers
Chacarita Juniors footballers